The 1986 Troy State Trojans football team represented Troy State University—now known as Troy University as a member of the Gulf South Conference (GSC) during the 1986 NCAA Division II football season. Led by second-year head coach Rick Rhoades, the Trojans compiled an overall record of 10–2 with a mark of 8–0 in conference play, winning the GSC title. The Trojans played their home games at Veterans Memorial Stadium in Troy, Alabama.

Schedule

References

Troy State
Troy Trojans football seasons
Gulf South Conference football champion seasons
Troy State Trojans football